Theodore Arcidi (born June 16, 1958) is an American former professional wrestler, actor and powerlifter from the United States of America. He is known to be the second man in history to bench press over 700 pounds in competition with add of a lifting jacket, establishing an official world record.

Powerlifting/Bench press world record
Ted Arcidi bench pressed 705.5 pounds (320 kg) on March 3, 1985 at Gus Rethwisch's Budweiser World Record Breakers in Honolulu, Hawaii for an APF & USPF world record, to become the second man to bench 700 pounds in an officially recognized powerlifting competition. Then, after being 5 1/2 years away from competition due to his wrestling career, he made the comeback of the decade. Weighing 291 pounds, Arcidi set another world record with an amazing 718.1 lbs bench press at the APF Bench Press Invitational on September 30, 1990, in Keene, New Hampshire. On September 14, 1991, at a Mr. Olympia contest, he squared off face to face with his greatest rival Anthony Clark to determine who the greatest bench presser of the world was. Arcidi defeated the much bigger Clark (5'8", 375 lbs) by pressing 725 pounds off his chest to establish yet a new, but controversial, world record. That attempt was later disqualified after it was revealed that Arcidi had failed to lock out his arms due to bone spurs in his elbows which he had corrected with surgery.

Arcidi's 705 pound all-time world record bench press was performed in one of the earliest bench shirts - an original prototype supportive bench press shirt, which was 50% polyester and 50% cotton and only one layer thick. It was thus later categorized as "equipped", although it did not improve his bench by much, if anything. In 1984 Arcidi had benched an official 666.9 pounds (302.5 kg) at 286.0 pounds bodyweight completely raw, without a bench shirt in Honolulu, Hawaii as well. He can be considered as arguably one of the greatest bench pressers of all time.

Personal records

Done in official powerlifting full meets
 Raw bench press:
 666.9 lbs (302.5 kg) @308 lb class (286 lb bodyweight) raw without wrist wraps (1984 Honolulu, Hawaii) (USPF/APF/WPC)
 650.4 lbs (295.0 kg) @275 lb class (275 lb bodyweight) raw without wrist wraps (1983 Westminster, Maryland) (NSM)
→ current all-time raw (unequipped) bench press world records in the 308lb and 275lb classref  (have never been surpassed since the 1980s)
Done in official bench-only invitational meet
 Equipped bench press: 718.1 lbs (325.7 kg) @308 lb class (291 lb bodyweight) in an early bench shirt (1990 Keene, New Hampshire) (APF)
→ former all-time bench press world record regardless of weight class and equipment

Professional wrestling career
Arcidi lifted for several years and eventually was sought by and debuted in Vince McMahon's World Wrestling Federation (WWF) in late 1985. Arcidi faced other "strongmen" such as Tony Atlas and Hercules Hernandez during his stint and made a single appearance at WrestleMania 2 in the WWF/NFL Battle Royal. During his time in the WWF in 1986, Arcidi wrestled veteran Big John Studd at the Boston Garden. During the match, Studd was noticeably wrestling stiff and showing contempt for someone he saw as nothing more than a weightlifter with no wrestling skills who had no business being in a professional wrestling ring.

Arcidi was released by the WWF upon the return of former Olympic "strongman" Ken Patera (who was returning after a 2-year stint in prison) as Vince McMahon did not want to have issues with having two men billed as the "World's Strongest Man". Although his tenure was brief, Arcidi did have an action figure produced by LJN for their Wrestling Superstars toy line. Patera had been instrumental in Arcidi's signing with Titan Sports-WWF. His final match was against Jake Roberts on February 14, 1987 in Calgary, Alberta.

After his WWF run, he went to Calgary and briefly worked for Stu Hart's Stampede Wrestling.  After that, Arcidi moved on the World Class Championship Wrestling in Dallas, Texas, where he was known as "Mr. 705" (referring to his world record bench press). He was managed by Percival Pringle III and was part of a stable of wrestlers including Rick Rude, the Dingo Warrior and Cactus Jack Manson. Arcidi captured that organization's Texas Heavyweight Championship on August 31, 1987 and held it until he lost to Matt Borne on November 10 that same year. Arcidi left the organization in 1990 to pursue other endeavors. He made several appearances in the Caribbean but never came back to national stature.

Business ventures
Arcidi has several ventures outside of his wrestling and bench press careers. Among these are his ownership of New England's largest women's gym in Manchester, New Hampshire, a supplement company called Arcidi Strength Systems, and a gym equipment company called Weightlifters Warehouse.  He is also heavily involved in real estate.  He is also focusing on an acting career with parts in such shows as Law & Order and has appeared in several commercials. In the early 1980s, he was a part-time Physical Education teacher at Concord Middle School in Concord, MA and ran a weightlifting class in the town through the middle 1980s. He was instrumental in the initial strength coaching of both Paul "Triple H" Levesque and Joanie "Chyna" Laurer and assisted them in contacting Killer Kowalski, who trained them for wrestling.

Championships and accomplishments
World Class Wrestling Association
WCWA Texas Heavyweight Championship (1 time)

Filmography
The table below comes from IMDb.

See also
 Progression of the bench press world record
 Anthony Clark
 Big James Henderson
 Jim Williams
 Shear'Ree

References

External links
 
 
 
 Ted Arcidi profile at Dave Hartnett's Power/Strength History website

American male professional wrestlers
Living people
Sportspeople from Nashua, New Hampshire
American powerlifters
American strength athletes
Professional wrestlers from New York (state)
1950s births
Stampede Wrestling alumni
20th-century professional wrestlers